Arfara is a village and a former municipality in Messenia, Peloponnese, Greece. Since the 2011 local government reform it is part of the municipality Kalamata, of which it is a municipal unit. The municipal unit has an area of 87.615 km2. Population 2,648 (2011). The village of Arfara lies about 15 km from Kalamata. Its name is taken from the first people who lived in Upper Arfara, the Arfaras, some of whom still live in Simi and Rodos. It was the seat of the former Arfara municipality. Arfara has 4 small areas called Servia, Lafazaneika, Skomara and Karagiorgaika.

Subdivisions
The municipal unit Arfara is subdivided into the following communities (constituent villages in brackets):
Agios Floros (Agios Floros, Christofilaiika)
Agrilos
Arfara (Arfara, Agios Konstantinos, Ano Arfara)
Pidima
Platy
Stamatinou (Stamatinou, Pelekito)
Velanidia
Vromovrisi (Vromovrisi, Ano Vromovrisi, Dremi, Krasopoula)

References

External links
Ministry of Internal Affairs, municipalities of Capodistrias plan

Populated places in Messenia